The canton of Cheval-Blanc is an administrative division of the Vaucluse department, in southeastern France. It was created at the French canton reorganisation which came into effect in March 2015. Its seat is in Cheval-Blanc.

It consists of the following communes: 
 
Cabrières-d'Avignon
Cadenet
Cheval-Blanc
Cucuron
Lagnes
Lauris
Lourmarin
Maubec
Mérindol
Puget
Puyvert
Robion
Taillades
Vaugines

References

Cantons of Vaucluse